The 1978 Assam Legislative Assembly election  was held to elect members for 126 assembly seats to constitute the seventh Assam Legislative Assembly. The Janata Party formed the first non-Congress government led by Golap Borbora with 53 seats on March 12, 1978. He resigned as chief minister on September 4, 1979 after losing the support of a majority of MLAs. Jogendra Nath Hazarika was sworn in as chief minister on 9 November 1978. But he existed in CM’s chair for only 94 days, as central government imposed President's rule in Assam.

Background
The Navnirman Andolan, which erupted in December 1973 started on the issue of hike in fees for an engineering college in Gujarat, Jayaprakash Narayan's movement against corruption, a three week long Bihar rail strike led by socialist leader George Fernandes, had destabilized the political atmosphere of India.  The sterilization program, which was tried to be implemented forcefully by Sanjay Gandhi, son of the then Prime Minister Indira Gandhi also created a lot of public outrage .

Results

Elected members

References 

Assam
State Assembly elections in Assam
1970s in Assam